USS Syren (later Siren) was a brig of the United States Navy built at Philadelphia in 1803. She served during the First Barbary War and the War of 1812 until the Royal Navy captured her in 1814. The British never commissioned her but apparently used her for a year or so as a lazaretto, or a prison vessel. She then disappears from records.

Description 
Syren was designed by Benjamin Hutton, Jr. of Philadelphia and built for the Navy in 1803 at Philadelphia by shipwright Nathaniel Hutton and launched on 6 August 1803. She was commissioned in September and Lieutenant Charles Stewart was appointed in command.

She was sharper, but smaller than USS Argus (1803), yet carried the same armament. Both vessels were built the same year for the First Barbary War.

Service history in US Navy

First Barbary War
Syren departed Philadelphia on 27 August 1803 and reached Gibraltar on 1 October. A fortnight later she sailed via Livorno to Algiers carrying presents and money to the Dey of Algiers. She then sailed to Syracuse, Sicily, where she arrived early in January 1804.

The first action Syren was involved in was an attack aimed at destroying , a frigate that had run aground the previous autumn and that Tripolitan gunboats had then captured. To prevent Philadelphia from opposing his planned operations against Tripoli, the commander of the American squadron in the Mediterranean, Commodore Edward Preble, decided to destroy her. To achieve this, Syren and ketch  sailed from Syracuse on 3 February 1804 and proceeded to Tripoli, which they reached on 7 February. However, before the American ships could launch their attack, they were driven off by a violent gale and did not get back off Tripoli until 16 February. Before the attack Syren tied up alongside Intrepid to transfer some of her crew for the assault on Philadelphia. Aboard Intrepid, under the command of Stephen Decatur, sailors from both Intrepid and Syren succeeded in burning Philadelphia. Also present during the assault was Thomas Macdonough of Syren.

Syren returned to Syracuse on the morning of 19 February. On 9 March, she and  sailed for Tripoli. Soon after their arrival, on 21 March 1804, she captured the armed brig Transfer belonging to the Pasha. Stewart took Transfer into US service and renamed her . She then served in the American squadron. The very next day Syren captured a polacca named Madona Catapolcana and sent her to Malta. Operations in the Mediterranean during the spring and summer of 1804 and participated in the attacks on Tripoli in August and September 1804. The ship continued to support the squadron's operation against Tripoli which forced the Pasha to accede to American demands. After a peace treaty with Tripoli was signed on 10 June 1805, the brig remained in the Mediterranean commanded by Master Commandant John Smith for almost a year helping to establish and maintain satisfactory relations with other Barbary states.

The ship returned to America in May 1806 and reached the Washington Navy Yard in August. She was laid up in ordinary there until recommissioned in 1807 and subsequently carried dispatches to France in 1809. In 1809, her sailing master at the Norfolk Navy Yard was Captain John "Mad Jack" Percival. The following year, her name was changed to Siren.

War of 1812
Little record has been found of the brig's service during the War of 1812, however small news items appeared in the Salem Gazette and the Boston Gazette.

Syren was now commanded by Lieutenant Joseph Bainbridge. The following month Syren left Belize and proceeded to Cuba where after three weeks searching for a Royal Navy sloop, probably Herald, she sailed for the coast of Florida putting in at New Orleans before departing on 9 May 1813. No prizes were taken during this voyage and the ship needed repairs.

By January 1814 Syren was in Massachusetts and was now commanded by Lieutenant Parker, In February she sailed along with a privateer, Grand Turk. Not long after sailing Parker died and command transferred to Lieutenant N.J. Nicholson.

Syren captured at least three merchant ships off the coast of Africa. On 28 May she captured and burnt , Hassler, master, which had been sailing from Africa to Liverpool. Then on 1 June Syren captured Adventure, which too was from Africa to Liverpool. She took-off their cargoes of ivory and sank them. Lastly, at some point Syren captured Catherine.

On 12 July 1814 Syren while cruising off the West African coast encountered the British ship  a 74-gun third rate ship of the line under the command of Captain Augustus Brine. Heavily outgunned, Syren attempted to run. After an 11-hour chase Medway captured her despite Syren having lightened her load by throwing overboard her guns, anchors and boats.  During her last voyage she had captured or sunk several British merchantmen. Among the prisoners was Samuel Leech, who later wrote an account of his experiences.

According to Samuel Leech, after being captured the crew of Syren were taken to the Cape of Good Hope, and after landing at Simonstown, marched to a jail in Cape Town. Here they were held until transferred to England when the war was over. On arriving at Simonstown, other American prisoners were seen to be leaving the jail and being shipped off to Dartmoor. The Syren crew met these again in England while waiting for transfer to the United States. Some had been present at 'The Massacre'.

British service history
After her capture by the Royal Navy she had a figurehead of a mermaid installed.

The Royal Navy used her as a lazaretto. She is no longer listed after 1815.

References

Bibliography
 Url

External links
 USS Syren's plans 

Brigs of the United States Navy
Barbary Wars American ships
War of 1812 ships of the United States
Ships built in Philadelphia
Vessels captured from the United States Navy
1803 ships
Captured ships